Operation Aderlass (English: Operation Bloodletting) is an investigation in Austria and Germany into alleged doping practices carried out by Erfurt-based German physician Mark Schmidt. Athletes from various disciplines have been named as alleged customers of Schmidt's, receiving illegal blood transfusion for the purpose of enhancing performances, with several of them having confessed.

History

The case first came to light through admissions by cross-country skier Johannes Dürr in late February 2019. He named Mark Schmidt, a physician based in the German city of Erfurt, as the head of an operation which carried out systematic blood doping. Schmidt had earlier been team doctor at both the Gerolsteiner and Milram cycling teams. In October 2009, Bernhard Kohl, who had been caught in a doping control while riding for Gerolsteiner in 2008, accused Schmidt of having overseen the doping practices. Schmidt denied the accusations. Following Dürr's statements, the police carried out a raid of the Erfurt offices on 27 February 2019. The investigation was carried out by the doping task force of the Munich police.

Involved athletes
On 20 March 2019, the state prosecutors in Bavaria confirmed that a total of 21 athletes were under suspicion of having been customers of Mark Schmidt. Not all names were initially reported, so as not to disturb investigative measures.

Winter sports
Following Dürr's statements, Austrian police arrested five athletes at the FIS Nordic World Ski Championships 2019 in Seefeld in Tirol. These were the cross-country skiers Max Hauke and Dominik Baldauf from Austria, Andreas Veerpalu and Karel Tammjärv from Estonia, as well as Alexey Poltoranin from Kazakhstan.

Initial reports suggested that a German speed skater was also involved with Schmidt. On 27 May 2019, the media reported that alpine ski racer Hannes Reichelt was interviewed by the police in the preceding week, concerning possible involvement in the affair. Reichelt vehemently denied the accusations. The charges against Reichelt were dropped on 16 October 2019.

Max Hauke received a suspended five-month sentence on 30 October 2019 from an Innsbruck court for doping violations reaching back to 2015. Dominik Baldauf also received a suspended five-month sentence on 14 January 2020 from the same court. Both athletes had received four-year bans from competition from the Austrian Anti-Doping Agency on 23 July 2019. On 27 January 2020, Johannes Dürr was given a suspended 15-month jail sentence for his involvement in the affair, after pleading guilty. He did however deny having set up connections between Schmidt and fellow cross-country skiers Hauke and Baldauf, as they had claimed. A report by German newspaper Der Tagesspiegel claimed that Dürr had contemplated taking over the doping operations from Schmidt.

The International Ski Federation (FIS) handed four-year bans from competition to Andreas Veerpalu, Karel Tammjärv, and Algo Kärp as well as two Estonian coaches on 29 November 2019. All three athletes had earlier admitted their involvement in the doping practices. Alexey Poltoranin, who had earlier admitted to doping as well, retracted his confession on 8 March 2019. On 12 March, the Kazakh Ministry of Culture and Sports cleared Poltoranin of any charges of having doped, claiming that he only intended to do so and "Fortunately [...] did not use blood doping". He was nevertheless handed a four-year ban from competition from FIS on 6 January 2020.

Cycling

On 3 March 2019, Stefan Denifl, who last rode for the Aqua Blue Sport team, confessed to using blood doping under the assistance of Schmidt. He nevertheless terminated his contract with the team. Both Denifl and Preidler were provisionally suspended by the sport's governing body, the UCI. Both were handed four-year bans by the Austrian anti-doping organisation on 27 June 2019, and might face charges for commercial sports fraud in addition to their suspensions. On 22 July 2020, Preidler was found guilty of fraud by the Innsbruck Regional Court and handed a twelve-month suspended prison sentence as well as being fined €2,880.

He was subsequently fired from his job as coach for the Swiss cycling federation.

On 14 May 2019, French newspaper Le Monde announced that retired Italian sprinter Alessandro Petacchi had allegedly worked with Schmidt in 2012 and 2013. Petacchi denied the accusations, but was nevertheless provisionally suspended by the UCI one day later. On 24 August 2019, Petacchi was given a two-year period of ineligibility from the UCI. Alongside Petacchi, Kristijan Koren, Kristijan Đurasek, and Borut Božič were also implicated and provisionally suspended. Koren and Đurasek were at the time riding the 2019 Giro d'Italia and the 2019 Tour of California respectively, while Božič worked as a directeur sportif for the Bahrain–Merida team. Later the same day, Bahrain–Merida and UAE Team Emirates confirmed that they had pulled their riders from the races. On 9 October, the UCI handed both Koren and Božič two-year bans from competition. On 13 November 2019, Đurasek was given a four-year ban from the UCI for his part in the doping practices.

On 19 May 2019, Italian newspaper Corriere della Sera reported links by Slovenian Milan Eržen to Operation Aderlass, while Eržen was serving as managing director of the Bahrain–Merida team. On 22 May, it was announced that the UCI had been following the activities of Eržen and Slovenian cycling in general in several investigations.

In May 2019, the UCI suspended mountain biker Christina Kollmann due to blood doping violations in relation to Operation Aderlass. She was subsequently banned from competition for four years and received an eight-month suspended jail sentence from an Austrian court in August 2019.

On 27 November 2019, the UCI announced that they had requested anti-doping samples from 2016 and 2017 to be retested, citing information gathered from Austrian authorities.

He was subsequently dismissed by Swiss Racing Academy, a team he had co-founded and where he was employed as manager and directeur sportif.

In September 2021, Björn Thurau was suspended from competition for nine years and six months, after his involvement came to light due to chat messages he had exchanged with Lang. The German National Anti-Doping Agency (NADA) chose a particularly hard sentence, the longest ever imposed on a German athlete, due to the fact that he not only used, but also distributed performance-enhancing substances. Thurau never publicly acknowledged the accusations. He was stripped of all results from December 2010 onwards.

Trial
The court trial against Schmidt began on 16 September 2020 at the Oberlandesgericht Munich. In their opening statement, the defense accused the prosecution of procedural errors, including illegal surveillance methods, incomplete paperwork, and undue custody.

On 29 September 2020, Schmidt took the stand and gave a confession in almost all of the 150 counts laid out against him. He admitted to having extracted blood from clients for the purposes of doping from as early as 2012. He did however deny to have acted for financial gain, claiming to have only received money to cover his costs, and insisted that the health of his clients had never been in danger. A day later, Johannes Dürr backed up Schmidt's claims. When testifying as a witness, Dürr claimed to have always "felt in safe, professional hands" with Schmidt. He furthermore refused to blame Schmidt for the doping, a decision he claimed to have taken with his coach. Three of the four co-defendants of Schmidt's also confessed, while another accused, a contractor, refused to testify. The contractor, Dirk Q., was sentenced to two years on probation in 2008 for bodily harm resulting in death, following an incident in January 2003, in which he allegedly assaulted two people, one of whom later died. Dirk Q. is said to have been part of Erfurt's neo nazi scene. In this trial, Q. is accused of having worked together with Schmidt, transporting blood as well as doing transfusions.

On 10 November 2020, Hondo testified in court, claiming that he doped with blood transfusions under Schmidt's guidance together with Petacchi during 2012. He testified that he had been contacted by Schmidt in late 2011 and then paid €25,000 for doping services over the course of the following year, at the end of which he ended the partnership. Hondo also described the usage of codenames, similar to Operación Puerto, with Hondo being known as "James Bond".

On 16 January 2021, Schmidt was sentenced to 4 years and 10 months in prison.

References

Doping cases in cycling
Doping cases in speed skating
Doping cases in cross-country skiing
2019 in Austrian sport
2019 in German sport
Doping in sport
2019 in cycle racing